Özlem Kaya may refer to:
 Özlem Kaya (athlete)
 Özlem Kaya (swimmer)